Ssanghwa-tang or ssanghwa-cha is a traditional Korean tea with deep brown colour and a slightly bitter taste. Along with sipjeondaebotang, it is one of the most popular types of medical tea in Korea.

It is made by boiling down a number of medical herbs such as dried roots of white woodland peony, steamed and dried roots of rehmannia, dried roots of Mongolian milkvetch, dried roots of Korean angelica, dried roots of lovage,  Chinese cinnamon barks, and Chinese liquorice. However, many people today buy the tea pre-made.

Efficacy and administration methods 
Ssanghwangtang is a herbal bath which was enjoyed in the morning and evening during the Joseon Dynasty. Precautions for use should be consulted with a doctor, pharmacist, etc. before taking it, such as patients with hypertension, heart failure or kidney disorder, edema patients, and patients receiving medical treatment.

See also 
Traditional Korean tea
Traditional Korean medicine

References 

Korean tea
Traditional Korean medicine
Herbal tea